A  is a country subdivision in several Latin American countries, mostly as top-level subnational divisions (except in Argentina). 
It is usually simply translated as "department".

Current use 
Ten countries currently have .

Past use 
Mexico in the 1830s was divided into 24 , which were first-level divisions. It was during an attempt to centralize the government.

Types of administrative division

pt:Departamento